Events from the year 1982 in Pakistan.

Incumbents

Federal government 
President: Muhammad Zia-ul-Haq
Chief Justice: Mohammad Haleem

Governors 
Governor of Balochistan: Rahimuddin Khan 
Governor of Khyber Pakhtunkhwa: Fazle Haq 
Governor of Punjab: Ghulam Jilani Khan 
Governor of Sindh: S.M. Abbasi

Events 
  Pakistan builds its first workable nuclear device.

Births 
January 3 – Salman Akbar, field hockey player
January 13 – Kamran Akmal, cricketer
February 1 – Shoaib Malik, cricketer

See also
1981 in Pakistan
Other events of 1982
1983 in Pakistan
List of Pakistani films of 1982
Timeline of Pakistani history

References

 
Pakistan
Pakistan
1980s in Pakistan
Years of the 20th century in Pakistan